is the 27th single by Japanese entertainer Akina Nakamori. Written by Taeko Onuki and Ryuichi Sakamoto, the song was released as a double-A single with "Not Crazy to Me" on May 21, 1993, by MCA Victor. It was also the lead single from her sixth compilation album Lyricism: Ballad Collection.

Background 
"Everlasting Love" marked Nakamori's return to the music industry after a two-year hiatus. After leaving Warner Pioneer in 1991, she resumed her acting career before moving to New York City in July 1992 to take a break from the entertainment business and improve her English skills. In the spring of 1993, Nakamori's management presented her Sakamoto's composition "Everlasting Love" and suggested she take a more contemporary direction in her music career.

Chart performance 
"Everlasting Love" peaked at No. 10 on Oricon's weekly singles chart and sold over 129,300 copies. It was also certified Gold by the RIAJ.

Track listing 
All music is composed and arranged by Ryuichi Sakamoto.

Charts

Certification

References

External links 
 
 

1993 singles
1993 songs
Akina Nakamori songs
Japanese-language songs
Songs written by Ryuichi Sakamoto
Universal Music Japan singles
MCA Records singles